Salomon Eberhard Henschen (28 February 1847 – 16 December 1930) was a Swedish doctor, professor and neurologist.

Biography
Henschen was born in Uppsala, Sweden. He was the son of Lars Wilhelm Henschen (1805–1885) and wife Augusta Munck af Rosenschöld (1806–1856). He had five siblings, including Maria Henschen (1840–1927), the founder of the Uppsala högre elementarläroverk för flickor and publicist  (1842–1925).

Beginning in 1862, he studied medicine at the University of Uppsala. Henschen would later teach to earn money during his studies: he taught natural sciences at his sister's school from 1864 to 1866 and at missionary Peter Fjellstedt's Fjellstedt School from 1870 to 1873.  He was a medical candidate in 1873. He conducted botanical research in Brazil from 1867 to 1869. After his return to Sweden, he resumed his medical studies at Uppsala. In 1874 he relocated to Stockholm University  and was awarded his medical license in 1877.  He then continued his education in Leipzig.

From 1878, he worked in the institute of pathology at the University of Uppsala, while in the meantime, he practiced medicine at a summer resort at Ronneby in Blekinge. In 1882 he was named professor and director at the clinic of internal medicine at Uppsala. From 1900, he worked at the Karolinska Institutet in Stockholm.

Henschen is known for his investigations of aphasia, as well as his systematic studies involving the visual components/pathways of the brain. His Klinische und anatomische Beiträge zur Pathologie des Gehirns (Clinical and anatomical contributions to the pathology of the brain) was published over 25 editions from 1890 to 1930. In 1919 he described dyscalculia, and later introduced the term acalculia to define the impairment of mathematical abilities in individuals with brain damage (1925).

In 1923–1924, he was one of a small group of neurologists who attended to Lenin, following the Soviet leader's third and final stroke. With his son, Folke Henschen (1881–1977), he collaborated on an autopsy of Lenin's brain.

Personal life
In 1897, he became a member of the Swedish Academy of Sciences. He became a member of the Royal Society of Arts and Sciences in Gothenburg in 1906.

He received an Honorary Doctorate at Uppsala University during 1900, at the University of Halle 1920 and at the University of Padua in 1922. In 1879, he married Gerda Maria Sandell (1852–1907). He was the grandfather of artist  (1917–2002) and was the great-great-grandfather of Sophie, Hereditary Princess of Liechtenstein.

He died in Stockholm in 1930 and was buried in the Uppsala old cemetery.

References

External links
 Pagel: Biographical Dictionary outstanding physicians of the nineteenth century. Berlin, Vienna, 1901, 720-721 Sp. (biography)
 Google Books Origins of Neuroscience: A History of Explorations Into Brain Function By Stanley Finger

1847 births
1930 deaths
Uppsala University alumni
Stockholm University alumni
Academic staff of Uppsala University
Academic staff of the Karolinska Institute
19th-century Swedish physicians
Swedish neurologists
Members of the Royal Swedish Academy of Sciences
Burials at Uppsala old cemetery
20th-century Swedish physicians